Francis Patrick Twomey (22 January 1890 – 25 May 1958) was an Australian rules footballer who played with Richmond in the Victorian Football League (VFL).

Notes

External links 

1890 births
1958 deaths
Australian rules footballers from Victoria (Australia)
Richmond Football Club players